Kingswood is a suburb of the Australian city of Adelaide in the City of Mitcham. 

Kingswood is bounded to the west by Belair Road, to the north by Cross Road, to the south by Princes Road and to the east by Unley High School and the western boundaries of properties fronting onto Smith Dorrien Street.

Kingswood was established in 1945 as a formal proposal by the City of Mitcham to "eliminate superfluous subdivisions names" as requested by the Surveyor General of South Australia. At establishment, it consisted of the sub-divisions of Kingswood Estate, Kingswood Park, Mitchemville and a portion of Old Mitcham.  In February 2003, it was enlarged by the addition of portions of the adjoining suburbs of Netherby and Mitcham.

The suburb is the home of Mitcham Primary School and Mitcham Girls High School.

References

Suburbs of Adelaide